Opinan is a remote scattered crofting hamlet, in Achnasheen, Ross-shire, Scottish Highlands and is in the Scottish council area of Highland.

The village of Mellon Udrigle lies directly to the southeast.

Populated places in Ross and Cromarty